The 2000 RCA Championships was a tennis tournament played on outdoor hard courts. It was the 13th edition of the event known that year as the RCA Championships, and was part of the International Series Gold of the 2000 ATP Tour. It took place at the Indianapolis Tennis Center in Indianapolis, Indiana, United States, from August 14 through August 20, 2000.

The singles draw featured ATP No. 2, French Open titlist, Hamburg and Santiago champion, Miami and Rome runner-up Gustavo Kuerten, Australian Open runner-up Yevgeny Kafelnikov, and Barcelona, Majorca and Toronto winner, Hamburg finalist Marat Safin. Other top seeds competing included Cincinnati winner Thomas Enqvist, Adelaide, Sydney, Scottsdale and Queen's Club champion Lleyton Hewitt, Tim Henman, Nicolás Lapentti and Marcelo Ríos.

Finals

Singles

 Gustavo Kuerten defeated  Marat Safin 3–6, 7–6(7–2), 7–6(7–2)
It was Gustavo Kuerten's 4th title of the year, and his 9th overall.

Doubles

 Lleyton Hewitt /  Sandon Stolle defeated  Jonas Björkman /  Max Mirnyi 6–2, 3–6, 6–3

References

External links
Official website
Singles draw
Doubles draw